In computing, netstat (network statistics) is a command-line network utility that displays network connections for Transmission Control Protocol (both incoming and outgoing), routing tables, and a number of network interface (network interface controller or software-defined network interface) and network protocol statistics. It is available on Unix, Plan 9, Inferno, and Unix-like operating systems including macOS, Linux, Solaris and BSD. It is also available on IBM OS/2 and on Microsoft Windows NT-based operating systems including Windows XP, Windows Vista, Windows 7, Windows 8 and Windows 10.

It is used for finding problems in the network and to determine the amount of traffic on the network as a performance measurement. On Linux this  program is mostly obsolete, although still included in many distributions.

On Linux, netstat (part of "net-tools") is superseded by ss (part of iproute2). The replacement for netstat -r is ip route, the replacement for netstat -i is ip -s link, and the replacement for netstat -g is ip maddr, all of which are recommended instead.

Statistics provided

Netstat provides statistics for the following:

 Proto – The name of the protocol (TCP or UDP).
 Local Address – The IP address of the local computer and the port number being used. The name of the local computer that corresponds to the IP address and the name of the port is shown unless the  parameter is specified. An asterisk (*) is shown for the host if the server is listening on all interfaces.  If the port is not yet established, the port number is shown as an asterisk.
 Foreign Address – The IP address and port number of the remote computer to which the socket is connected. The names that corresponds to the IP address and the port are shown unless the  parameter is specified. If the port is not yet established, the port number is shown as an asterisk (*).
 State – Indicates the state of a TCP connection. For more information about the states of a TCP connection, see .

Parameters
Parameters used with this command must be prefixed with a hyphen rather than a slash.  Some parameters are not supported on all platforms.

Examples

Cross platform
On macOS, BSD systems, Linux distributions, and Microsoft Windows:

To display the statistics for only the TCP or UDP protocols, type one of the following commands:

netstat -sp tcp

netstat -sp udp

Unix-like
On Unix-like systems:

To display all ports open by a process with id pid:

netstat -aop | grep "pid"

To continuously display open TCP and UDP connections numerically and also which program is using them on Linux:
netstat -nutpacw

Windows
On Microsoft Windows:

To display active TCP connections and the process IDs every 5 seconds, type the following command (works on NT based systems only, or Windows 2000 with hotfix):

netstat -o 5

To display active TCP connections and the process IDs using numerical form, type the following command (works on NT based systems only, or Windows 2000 with hotfix):

netstat -no

*nix

Wildcards
Netstat uses an asterisk * as a wildcard which means "any". An example would be

Example output:
....Local Address Foreign Address State
... *:smtp          *:*   LISTEN

Under "Local Address" *, in *:smtp, means the process is listening on all of the network interfaces the machine has for the port mapped as smtp (see /etc/services for service resolution). This can also be shown as 0.0.0.0.
The first *, in *:*, means connections can come from any IP address, and the second *, in *:*, means the connection can originate from any port on the remote machine.

Caveats
Some versions of netstat lack explicit field delimiters in their printf-generated output, leading to numeric fields running together and thus corrupting the output data.

Platform specific remarks

Under Linux, raw data can often be obtained from the /proc/net/dev to work around the printf output corruption arising in netstat's network interface statistics summary, netstat -i, until such time as the problem is corrected.

On the Windows platform, netstat information can be retrieved by calling the GetTcpTable and GetUdpTable functions in the IP Helper API, or IPHLPAPI.DLL. Information returned includes local and remote IP addresses, local and remote ports, and (for GetTcpTable) TCP status codes. In addition to the command-line netstat.exe tool that ships with Windows, GUI-based netstat programs are available.

On the Windows platform, this command is available only if the Internet Protocol (TCP/IP) protocol is installed as a component in the properties of a network adapter in Network Connections.

On the Windows platform running Remote Desktop Services (formerly Terminal Services) it will only show connections for the current user, not for the whole computer.

On macOS, the /System/Library/CoreServices/Applications folder (or /Applications/Utilities in OS X Mountain Lion and earlier) contains a network GUI utility called Network Utility, the Netstat tab of which runs the netstat command and displays its output in the tab.

See also

 ss, a Linux utility to investigate sockets from iproute2 meant to replace netstat
 lsof -i
 bmon

References

Further reading

External links

Microsoft TechNet: Netstat – documentation for the Windows netstat.exe command-line program
net-tools project page on SourceForge
Netstat Command: WindowsCMD.com 

Unix network-related software
Plan 9 commands
Inferno (operating system) commands
OS/2 commands
Windows communication and services
Windows administration